The 2012–13 1. FC Nürnberg season is the 113th season in the club's football history.

Review and events
In 2012–13, the club plays in the Bundesliga, the top tier of German football. It is the clubs fourth consecutive season in this league, having been promoted from the 2. Bundesliga in 2009.

The club also took part in the 2012–13 edition of the DFB-Pokal, the German Cup, where it was knocked out by fourth division side TSV Havelse, losing 3–2 in extra time.

Matches

Legend

Friendly matches

Bundesliga

League results and fixtures

League table

Current league table

Results summary

DFB-Pokal

Overall

Squad

Squad and statistics

Sources

External links
 2012–13 1. FC Nürnberg season at Weltfussball.de 
 2012–13 1. FC Nürnberg season at kicker.de 
 2012–13 1. FC Nürnberg season at Fussballdaten.de 

Nuremberg
1. FC Nürnberg seasons